The 1993 Icelandic Cup was the 34th edition of the National Football Cup.

It took place between 26 May 1993 and 29 August 1993, with the final played at Laugardalsvöllur in Reykjavik. The cup was important, as winners qualified for the UEFA Cup Winners' Cup (if a club won both the league and the cup, the defeated finalists would take their place in the Cup Winners' Cup).

The 10 clubs from the 1. Deild entered in the last 16, with clubs from lower tiers entering in the three preliminary rounds. Teams played one-legged matches. In case of a draw, a penalty shoot-out took place (there were no replays, unlike in previous years).

ÍA Akranes, 1993 Icelandic Champions, won the double by beating ÍBK Keflavík in the final to win their sixth Icelandic Cup, and qualify for Europe.

Second round

Third round

Fourth round 

 Entry of ten teams from the 1. Deild

Quarter finals

Semi finals

Final 

 ÍA Akranes won their sixth Icelandic Cup, and qualified for the 1994–95 European Cup Winners' Cup.

See also 

 1993 Úrvalsdeild
 Icelandic Men's Football Cup

External links 
  1993 Icelandic Cup results at the site of the Icelandic Football Federation

Icelandic Men's Football Cup
Iceland
1993 in Iceland